The 1946 Yugoslav Women's Basketball League is the 2nd season of the Yugoslav Women's Basketball League, the highest professional basketball league in Yugoslavia for women's. Championships is played in 1946 in Belgrade and played four teams. Champion for this season is Crvena zvezda.

Table

External links
 History of league

Yugoslav Women's Basketball League seasons
Women
1946 in women's basketball
basketball